James Cummings  (12 July 1878 – 24 September 1976) was a New Zealand police officer and police commissioner. He was born in Tuapeka Flat, South Otago, New Zealand. He was the brother of Denis Joseph Cummings.

In the 1950 New Year Honours, Cummings was appointed a Commander of the Order of the British Empire.

References

1878 births
1976 deaths
New Zealand Commissioners of Police
People from Otago
New Zealand Commanders of the Order of the British Empire